Edwin Lionel Wilson (E. L Wilson) (28 March 186124 November 1951), along with Alan Mansfield was the founder of Collingwood Football Club. Wilson was approached by the newly formed club to be appointed president, which he rejected. He went on to become the first secretary of the Collingwood Football Club  and also the first secretary of the Victorian Football League when the VFL was established in 1897. He held the position of secretary of the VFL for thirty-four years from 1897 to 1929.

In 1930, the E. L. Wilson Shield was created to be awarded to each year's premiership winning team.  It was initially discontinued in 1978, when there was no room remaining on the shield, but expanded and reintroduced as a perpetual trophy in 2016.

References

1861 births
1951 deaths
Collingwood Football Club administrators
VFL/AFL administrators